Cass County is a county located in the U.S. state of Texas. As of the 2020 census, its population was 28,454. The county seat is Linden. The county was named for United States Senator Lewis Cass (D-Michigan), who favored the U.S. annexation of Texas in the mid-19th century.

History
Cass County was formed in 1846 from sections of Bowie County.  It was named for Lewis Cass, a U.S. Senator from Michigan who had favored the annexation of Texas to the United States.

The county was originally developed by planters for cotton plantations. By 1860, the majority of the population were enslaved African Americans. After the war, freedmen worked largely as tenant farmers and sharecroppers into the early 20th century. Black residents faced violence and discrimination in Cass County, which was the location of nine lynchings, the fifth-highest total among Texas' 254 counties.

From 1861 to 1871, this county was known as Davis County, after Jefferson Davis, the president of the Confederate States of America. (It should not be confused with the still extant Jeff Davis County in West Texas.)

Geography

Cass County, Texas is one of only three counties in Texas to border two other U.S. states (the others are Bowie and Dallam counties). Cass County forms part of the tripoint of Texas-Arkansas-Louisiana.

Adjacent counties
 Bowie County (north)
 Miller County, Arkansas (northeast)
 Caddo Parish, Louisiana (southeast)
 Marion County (south)
 Morris County (west)

Major highways
  U.S. Highway 59
  Interstate 369 is currently under construction and will follow the current route of U.S. 59 in most places.
  State Highway 8
  State Highway 11
  State Highway 77
  State Highway 155
  Farm to Market Road 248
  Farm to Market Road 250

State protected area
 Atlanta State Park

Communities

Cities
 Atlanta
 Hughes Springs (small part in Morris County)
 Linden (county seat)
 Queen City

Towns
 Avinger
 Bloomburg
 Domino
 Douglassville
 Marietta

Unincorporated communities

 Bivins
 Kildare
 Lanark
 Love
 McLeod
 Smyrna

Demographics

Note: the US Census treats Hispanic/Latino as an ethnic category. This table excludes Latinos from the racial categories and assigns them to a separate category. Hispanics/Latinos can be of any race.

The 2020 U.S. census reported a population of 28,454 residents, down from 2010's 30,464. The racial makeup of the county in 2010 was 78.20% White, 19.47% Black or African American, 0.47% Native American, 0.14% Asian, 0.02% Pacific Islander, 0.65% from other races, and 1.05% from two or more races.  1.73% of the population were Hispanic or Latino of any race. Among the population in 2020, its racial and ethnic makeup was 73.90% non-Hispanic white, 15.88% Black or African American, 0.54% Native American, 0.42% Asian, 0.04% Pacific Islander, 0.30% some other race, 4.22% multiracial, and 4.70% Hispanic or Latino American of any race.

In 2010, there were 12,190 households, out of which 30.20% had children under the age of 18 living with them, 54.90% were married couples living together, 12.20% had a female householder with no husband present, and 29.00% were non-families; 26.40% of all households were made up of individuals, and 13.50% had someone living alone who was 65 years of age or older. The average household size was 2.46 and the average family size was 2.95. The median income for a household in the county was $28,441, and the median income for a family was $35,623. Males had a median income of $30,906 versus $19,726 for females. The per capita income for the county was $15,777. About 14.70% of families and 17.70% of the population were below the poverty line, including 22.20% of those under age 18 and 17.90% of those age 65 or over.

Education

The following school districts serve Cass County:
 Atlanta ISD
 Avinger ISD (small portion in Marion County)
 Bloomburg ISD
 Hughes Springs ISD (small portion in Morris County)
 Linden-Kildare CISD
 McLeod ISD
 Marietta ISD
 Queen City ISD
 Pewitt CISD (mostly in Morris County, small portion in Titus County)

Politics

In popular culture
Don Henley named his 2015 album Cass County, as he had grown up here.

See also

 National Register of Historic Places listings in Cass County, Texas
 Recorded Texas Historic Landmarks in Cass County

References

External links

 
 
 Cass County government's website
 Cass County Radio Station KPYN am900
 Cass County TV Station KAQC TV 20

 
1846 establishments in Texas
Populated places established in 1846